The Animal Liberation Front (ALF) is an international, leaderless, decentralized political and social resistance movement that engages in and promotes non-violent direct action in protest against incidents of animal cruelty. It originated in the 1970s from the Bands of Mercy. Participants state it is a modern-day Underground Railroad, removing animals from laboratories and farms, destroying facilities, arranging safe houses, veterinary care and operating sanctuaries where the animals subsequently live. Critics have labelled them as eco-terrorists.

Active in over 40 countries, ALF cells operate clandestinely, consisting of small groups of friends and sometimes just one person, which makes the movement difficult for the authorities to monitor. Robin Webb of the Animal Liberation Press Office has said: "That is why the ALF cannot be smashed, it cannot be effectively infiltrated, it cannot be stopped. You, each and every one of you: you are the ALF."

Activists say the movement is non-violent. According to the ALF's code, any act that furthers the cause of animal liberation, where all reasonable precautions are taken not to harm human or non-human life, may be claimed as an ALF action, including acts of vandalism causing economic damage. American activist Rod Coronado said in 2006: "One thing that I know that separates us from the people we are constantly accused of being—that is, terrorists, violent criminals—is the fact that we have harmed no one."

There has nevertheless been widespread criticism that ALF spokespersons and activists have either failed to condemn acts of violence or have themselves engaged in it, either in the name of the ALF or under another banner. The criticism has been accompanied by dissent within the animal rights movement itself about the use of violence, and increasing attention from the police and intelligence communities. In 2002 the Southern Poverty Law Center (SPLC), which monitors extremism in the United States, noted the involvement of the ALF in the Stop Huntingdon Animal Cruelty campaign, which SPLC identified as using terrorist tactics—though a later SPLC report also noted that they have not killed anyone. In 2005 the ALF was included in a United States Department of Homeland Security planning document listing a number of domestic terrorist threats on which the U.S. government expected to focus resources. That same year FBI deputy assistant director John Lewis stated that "eco terrorism" and the "animal rights movement" were "the number one domestic terrorism threat." In the UK, ALF actions are regarded as examples of domestic extremism, and are handled by the National Extremism Tactical Coordination Unit, set up in 2004 to monitor ALF and other illegal animal rights activity.

Origins

Band of Mercy

The roots of the ALF trace back to December 1963, when British journalist John Prestige was assigned to cover a Devon and Somerset Staghounds event, where he watched hunters chase and kill a pregnant deer. In protest, he formed the Hunt Saboteurs Association (HSA), which evolved into groups of volunteers trained to thwart the hunts' hounds by blowing horns and laying false scents.

Animal rights writer Noel Molland writes that one of these HSA groups was formed in 1971 by a law student from Luton named Ronnie Lee. In 1972, Lee and fellow activist Cliff Goodman decided more militant tactics were needed. They revived the name of a 19th-century RSPCA youth group, The Bands of Mercy, and with about half a dozen activists set up the Band of Mercy, which attacked hunters' vehicles by slashing tires and breaking windows, designed to stop the hunt from even beginning, rather than thwarting it once underway.

In 1973, the Band learned that Hoechst Pharmaceuticals was building a research laboratory in Milton Keynes. On 10 November 1973, two activists set fire to the building, causing £26,000 worth of damage, returning six days later to set fire to what was left of it. It was the animal liberation movement's first known act of arson. In June 1974, two Band activists set fire to boats taking part in the annual seal cull off the coast of Norfolk, which Molland writes was the last time the cull took place. Between June and August 1974, the Band launched eight raids against animal-testing laboratories, and others against chicken breeders and gun shops, damaging buildings or vehicles. Its first act of "animal liberation" took place during the same period when activists removed half a dozen guinea pigs from a guinea pig farm in Wiltshire, after which the owner closed the business, fearing further incidents. Then, as now, property crime caused a split within the fledgling movement. In July 1974, the Hunt Saboteurs Association offered a £250 reward for information leading to the identification of the Band of Mercy, telling the press, "We approve of their ideals, but are opposed to their methods."

ALF formed
In August 1974, Lee and Goodman were arrested for taking part in a raid on Oxford Laboratory Animal Colonies in Bicester, earning them the moniker the "Bicester Two". Daily demonstrations took place outside the court during their trial; Lee's local Labour MP, Ivor Clemitson, was one of their supporters. They were sentenced to three years in prison, during which Lee went on the movement's first hunger strike to obtain vegan food and clothing. They were paroled after 12 months, Lee emerging in the spring of 1976 more militant than ever. He gathered together the remaining Band of Mercy activists and two dozen new recruits, 30 in all. Molland writes that the Band of Mercy name sounded wrong as a description of what Lee saw as a revolutionary movement. Lee wanted a name that would haunt those who used animals, according to Molland. Thus, the Animal Liberation Front was born.

Structure and aims

Underground and above-ground

The movement has underground and above-ground components, and is entirely decentralized with no formal hierarchy, the absence of which acts as a firebreak when it comes to legal responsibility. Volunteers are expected to stick to the ALF's stated aims when using its banner:
To inflict economic damage on those who profit from the misery and exploitation of animals.
To liberate animals from places of abuse, i.e. laboratories, factory farms, fur farms etc., and place them in good homes where they may live out their natural lives, free from suffering.
To reveal the horror and atrocities committed against animals behind locked doors, by performing nonviolent direct actions and liberations
To take all necessary precautions against harming any animal, human and non-human.
Any group of people who are vegans and who carry out actions according to ALF guidelines have the right to regard themselves as part of the ALF.

A number of above-ground groups exist to support covert volunteers. The Animal Liberation Front Supporters Group (ALF SG) adopts activists in jail as prisoners of conscience; anyone can join the ALFSG for a small monthly fee. The Vegan Prisoners Support Group, created in 1994 when British activist Keith Mann was first jailed, works with prison authorities in the UK to ensure that ALF prisoners have access to vegan supplies. The Animal Liberation Press Office receives and publicizes anonymous communiqués from volunteers; it operates as an ostensibly independent group funded by public donations, though the High Court in London ruled in 2006 that its press officer in the UK, Robin Webb, was a pivotal figure in the ALF.

There are three publications associated with the ALF. Arkangel was a British bi-annual magazine founded by Ronnie Lee. Bite Back is a website where activists leave claims of responsibility; it published a "Direct Action Report" in 2005 stating that, in 2004 alone, ALF activists had removed 17,262 animals from facilities, and had claimed 554 acts of vandalism and arson. No Compromise is a San Francisco-based website that also reports on ALF actions.

Philosophy of direct action
ALF activists argue that animals should not be viewed as property, and that scientists and industry have no right to assume ownership of living beings who are the "subjects-of-a-life" in the words of philosopher Tom Regan. In the view of the ALF, to fail to recognize this is an example of speciesism—the ascription of different values to beings on the basis of their species membership alone, which they argue is as ethically flawed as racism or sexism. They reject the animal welfarist position that more humane treatment is needed for animals; they say their aim is empty cages, not bigger ones. Activists argue that the animals they remove from laboratories or farms are "liberated", not "stolen", because they were never rightfully owned in the first place.

Although the ALF members reject violence against people, many activists support property crime, comparing the destruction of animal laboratories and other facilities to resistance fighters blowing up gas chambers in Nazi Germany. Their argument for sabotage is that the removal of animals from a laboratory simply means they will be quickly replaced, but if the laboratory itself is destroyed, it not only slows down the restocking process, but increases costs, possibly to the point of making animal research prohibitively expensive; this, they argue, will encourage the search for alternatives. An ALF activist involved in an arson attack on the University of Arizona told No Compromise in 1996: "[I]t is much the same thing as the abolitionists who fought against slavery going in and burning down the quarters or tearing down the auction block ... Sometimes when you just take animals and do nothing else, perhaps that is not as strong a message."

The provision against violence in the ALF code has triggered divisions within the movement and allegations of hypocrisy from the ALF's critics.  In 1998, terrorism expert Paul Wilkinson called the ALF and its splinter groups "the most serious domestic terrorist threat within the United Kingdom." In 1993, ALF was listed as an organization that has "claimed to have perpetrated acts of extremism in the United States" in the Report to Congress on the Extent and Effects of Domestic and International Terrorism on Animal Enterprises. It was named as a terrorist threat by the U.S. Department of Homeland Security in January 2005. In March 2005, a speech from the Counterterrorism Division of the FBI stated that: "The eco-terrorist movement has given rise and notoriety to groups such as the Animal Liberation Front, or ALF, and the Earth Liberation Front (ELF). These groups exist to commit serious acts of vandalism, and to harass and intimidate owners and employees of the business sector." In hearings held on 18 May 2005, before a Senate panel, officials of the FBI and the Bureau of Alcohol, Tobacco, Firearms, and Explosives (ATF) stated that "violent animal rights extremists and eco-terrorists now pose one of the most serious terrorism threats to the nation." The use of the terrorist label has been criticized, however; the Southern Poverty Law Center, which tracks U.S. domestic extremism, writes that "for all the property damage they have wreaked, eco-radicals have killed no one." Philosopher and animal rights activist Steven Best writes that "given the enormity and magnitude of animal suffering ... one should notice that the ALF has demonstrated remarkable restraint in their war of liberation."

Best and trauma surgeon Jerry Vlasak, both of whom have volunteered for the North American press office, were banned from entering the UK in 2004 and 2005 after making statements that appeared to support violence against people. Vlasak told an animal rights conferences in 2003: "I don't think you'd have to kill—assassinate—too many vivisectors before you would see a marked decrease in the amount of vivisection going on. And I think for five lives, 10 lives, 15 human lives, we could save a million, two million, 10 million non-human animals." Best coined the term "extensional self-defence" to describe actions carried out in defense of animals by human beings acting as proxies. He argues that activists have the moral right to engage in acts of sabotage or even violence because animals are unable to fight back themselves. Best argues that the principle of extensional self-defense mirrors the penal code statues known as the necessity defense, which can be invoked when a defendant believes the illegal act was necessary to avoid imminent and great harm. Best argues that "extensional self defense" is not just a theory, but put into practice in some African countries, where hired armed soldiers occasionally use lethal force against poachers who would kill rhinos, elephants and other endangered animals for their body parts to be sold in international markets.

The nature of the ALF as a leaderless resistance means support for Vlasak and Best is hard to measure. An anonymous volunteer interviewed in 2005 for CBS's 60 Minutes said of Vlasak: "[H]e doesn't operate with our endorsement or our support or our appreciation, the support of the ALF. We have a strict code of non-violence ... I don't know who put Dr. Vlasak in the position he's in. It wasn't us, the ALF."

Philosopher Peter Singer of Princeton University has argued that ALF direct action can only be regarded as a just cause if it is non-violent, and that the ALF is at its most effective when uncovering evidence of animal abuse that other tactics could not expose. He cites 1984's "Unnecessary Fuss" campaign, when ALF raided the University of Pennsylvania's head-injury research clinic and removed footage showing researchers laughing at the brain damage of conscious baboons, as an example. The university responded that the treatment of the animals conformed to National Institutes of Health (NIH) guidelines, but as a result of the publicity, the lab was closed down, the chief veterinarian fired, and the university placed on probation. Barbara Orlans, a former animal researcher with the NIH, now with the Kennedy Institute of Ethics, writes that the case stunned the biomedical community, and is today considered one of the most significant cases in the ethics of using animals in research. Singer argues that if the ALF would focus on this kind of direct action, instead of sabotage, it would appeal to the minds of reasonable people. Against this, Steven Best writes that industries and governments have too much institutional and financial bias for reason to prevail.

Peter Hughes of the University of Sunderland cites a 1988 raid in the UK led by ALF activist Barry Horne as an example of positive ALF direct action. Horne and four other activists decided to free Rocky, a dolphin who had lived in a small concrete pool in Marineland in Morecambe for 20 years, by moving him  from his pool to the sea. The police spotted them carrying a homemade dolphin stretcher, and they were convicted of conspiracy to steal, but they continued to campaign for Rocky's release. Marineland eventually agreed to sell him for £120,000, money that was raised with the help of the Born Free Foundation and the Mail on Sunday, and in 1991 Rocky was transferred to an  lagoon reserve in the Turks and Caicos Islands, then released. Hughes writes that the ALF action helped to create a paradigm shift in the UK toward seeing dolphins as "individual actors", as a result of which, he writes, there are now no captive dolphins in the UK.

Early tactics and ideology

Rachel Monaghan of the University of Ulster writes that, in their first year of operation alone, ALF actions accounted for £250,000 worth of damage, targeting butchers shops, furriers, circuses, slaughterhouses, breeders, and fast-food restaurants. She writes that the ALF philosophy was that violence can only take place against sentient life forms, and therefore focusing on property destruction and the removal of animals from laboratories and farms was consistent with a philosophy of non-violence, despite the damage they were causing. In 1974, Ronnie Lee insisted that direct action be "limited only by reverence of life and hatred of violence", and in 1979, he wrote that many ALF raids had been called off because of the risk to life.

Kim Stallwood, a national organiser for the British Union for the Abolition of Vivisection (BUAV) in the 1980s, writes that the public's response to early ALF raids that removed animals was very positive, in large measure because of the non-violence policy. When Mike Huskisson removed three beagles from a tobacco study at ICI in June 1975, the media portrayed him as a hero. Robin Webb writes that ALF volunteers were viewed as the "Robin Hoods of the animal welfare world".

Stallwood writes that they saw ALF activism as part of their opposition to the state, rather than as an end-in-itself, and did not want to adhere to non-violence. In the early 1980s, the BUAV, an anti-vivisection group founded by Frances Power Cobbe in 1898, was among the ALF's supporters. Stallwood writes that it donated part of its office space rent-free to the ALF Supporters Group, and gave ALF actions uncritical support in its newspaper, The Liberator. In 1982, a group of ALF activists, including Roger Yates, now a sociologist at University College, Dublin, and Dave McColl, a director of Sea Shepherd Conservation Society, became members of the BUAV's executive committee, and used their position to radicalize the organization. Stallwood writes that the new executive believed all political action to be a waste of time, and wanted the BUAV to devote its resources exclusively to direct action. Whereas the earliest activists had been committed to rescuing animals, and destroyed property only where it contributed to the former, by the mid-1980s, Stallwood believed the ALF had lost its ethical foundation, and had become an opportunity "for misfits and misanthropes to seek personal revenge for some perceived social injustice". He writes: "Where was the intelligent debate about tactics and strategies that went beyond the mindless rhetoric and emotional elitism pervading much of the self-produced direct action literature? In short, what had happened to the animals' interests?" In 1984, the BUAV board reluctantly voted to expel the ALF SG from its premises and withdraw its political support, after which, Stallwood writes, the ALF became increasingly isolated.

Development of the ALF in the U.S.

There are conflicting accounts of when the ALF first emerged in the United States. The FBI writes that animal rights activists had a history of committing low-level criminal activity in the U.S. dating back to the 1970s. Freeman Wicklund and Kim Stallwood say the first ALF action there was on 29 May 1977, when researchers Ken LeVasseur and Steve Sipman released two dolphins, Puka and Kea, into the ocean from the University of Hawaii's Marine Mammal Laboratory. The North American Animal Liberation Press Office attributes the dolphin release to a group called Undersea Railroad, and says the first ALF action was, in fact, a raid on the New York University Medical Center on 14 March 1979, when activists removed one cat, two dogs, and two guinea pigs.

Kathy Snow Guillermo writes in Monkey Business that the first ALF action was the removal on 22 September 1981, of the Silver Spring monkeys, 17 lab monkeys in the legal custody of People for the Ethical Treatment of Animals (PETA), after a researcher who had been experimenting on them was arrested for alleged violations of cruelty legislation. When the court ruled that the monkeys be returned to the researcher, they mysteriously disappeared, only to reappear five days later when PETA learned that legal action against the researcher could not proceed without the monkeys as evidence.

Ingrid Newkirk, the president of PETA, writes that the first ALF cell was set up in late 1982, after a police officer she calls "Valerie" responded to the publicity triggered by the Silver Spring monkeys case, and flew to England to be trained by the ALF. Posing as a reporter, Valerie was put in touch with Ronnie Lee by Kim Stallwood, who at the time was working for the BUAV. Lee directed her to a training camp, where she was taught how to break into laboratories. Newkirk writes that Valerie returned to Maryland and set up an ALF cell, with the first raid taking place on 24 December 1982 against Howard University, where 24 cats were removed, some of whose back legs had been crippled. Jo Shoesmith, an American attorney and animal rights activist, says Newkirk's account of "Valerie" is not only fictionalized, as Newkirk acknowledges, but totally fictitious.

Two early ALF raids led to the closure of several university studies. A 28 May 1984 raid on the University of Pennsylvania's head injury clinic caused $60,000 worth of damage and saw the removal of 60 hours of tapes, which showed the researchers laughing as they used a hydraulic device to cause brain damage to baboons. The tapes were turned over to PETA, who produced a 26-minute video called Unnecessary Fuss. The head injury clinic was closed, the university's chief veterinarian was fired, and the university was put on probation.

On 20 April 1985, acting on a tip-off from a student, the ALF raided a laboratory in the University of California, Riverside, causing $700,000 in damages and removing 468 animals. These included Britches, a five-week-old macaque, who had been separated from his mother at birth and left alone with his eyes sewn shut and a sonar device on his head as part of a study into blindness. The raid, which was taped by the ALF, caused eight of the laboratory's seventeen active research projects to be shut down, and the university said years of medical research were lost. The raid prompted National Institutes of Health director James Wyngaarden to argue that the raids should be regarded as acts of terrorism.

Animal Rights Militia and Justice Department
Monaghan writes that, around 1982, there was a noticeable shift in the non-violent position, and not one approved by everyone in the movement. Some activists began to make personal threats against individuals, followed by letter bombs and threats to contaminate food, the latter representing yet another shift to threatening the general public, rather than specific targets.

In 1982, letter bombs were sent to all four major party leaders in the UK, including Prime Minister Margaret Thatcher. The first major food scare happened in November 1984, with the ALF claiming to the media that it had contaminated Mars Bars as part of a campaign to force the Mars company to stop conducting tooth decay tests on monkeys. On 17 November, the Sunday Mirror received a call from the ALF saying it had injected Mars Bars in stores throughout the country with rat poison. The call was followed by a letter containing a Mars Bar, presumed to be contaminated, and the claim that these were on sale in London, Leeds, York, Southampton, and Coventry. Millions of bars were removed from shelves and Mars halted production, at a cost to the company of $4.5 million. The ALF admitted the claims had been a hoax. Similar contamination claims were later made against L'Oréal and Lucozade.

The letter bombs were claimed by the Animal Rights Militia (ARM), although the initial statement in November 1984 by David Mellor, then a Home Office minister, stated that it was the Animal Liberation Front who had claimed responsibility. This is an early example of the shifting of responsibility from one banner to another depending on the nature of the act, with the ARM and another nom de guerre, the Justice Department—the latter first used in 1993—emerging as names for direct action that violated the ALF's "no harm to living beings" principle. Ronnie Lee, who had earlier insisted on the importance of the ALF's non-violence policy, seemed to support the idea. An article signed by RL—presumed to be Ronnie Lee—in the October 1984 ALF Supporters Group newsletter, suggested that activists set up "fresh groups ... under new names whose policies do not preclude the use of violence toward animal abusers".

No activist is known to have conducted operations under both the ALF and ARM banners, but overlap is assumed. Terrorism expert Paul Wilkinson has written that the ALF, the Justice Department, and the ARM are essentially the same thing, and Robert Garner of the University of Leicester writes that it would be pointless to argue otherwise, given the nature of the movement as a leaderless resistance. Robin Webb of the British Animal Liberation Press Office has acknowledged that the activists may be the same people: "If someone wishes to act as the Animal Rights Militia or the Justice Department, simply put, the ... policy of the Animal Liberation Front, to take all reasonable precautions not to endanger life, no longer applies."

From 1983 onwards, a series of fire bombs exploded in department stores that sold fur, with the intention of triggering the sprinkler systems in order to cause damage, although several stores were partly or completely destroyed. In September 1985, incendiary devices were placed under the cars of Sharat Gangoli and Stuart Walker, both animal researchers with the British Industrial Biological Research Association (BIBRA), wrecking both vehicles but with no injuries, and the ARM claimed responsibility. In January 1986, the ARM said it had placed devices under the cars of four employees of Huntingdon Life Sciences, timed to explode an hour apart from each other. A further device was placed under the car of Andor Sebesteny, a researcher for the Imperial Cancer Research Fund, which he spotted before it exploded. The next major attacks on individual researchers took place in 1990, when the cars of two veterinary researchers were destroyed by sophisticated explosive devices in two separate explosions. In February 1989, an explosion damaged the Senate House bar in Bristol University, an attack claimed by the unknown "Animal Abused Society". In June 1990, two days apart, bombs exploded in the cars of Margaret Baskerville, a veterinary surgeon working at Porton Down, a chemical research defence establishment, and Patrick Max Headley, a physiologist at Bristol University. Baskerville escaped without injury by jumping through the window of her mini-jeep when a bomb using a mercury-tilt device exploded next to the fuel tank. During the attack on Headley—which New Scientist writes involved the use of plastic explosives—a 13-month-old baby in a push-chair suffered flash burns, shrapnel wounds, and a partially severed finger. A wave of letter bombs followed in 1993, one of which was opened by the head of the Hereford site of GlaxoSmithKline, causing burns to his hands and face. Eleven similar devices were intercepted in postal sorting offices.

False flags and plausible deniability

The nature of the ALF exposes its name to the risk of being used by activists who reject its non-violence platform, or by opponents conducting so-called "false-flag" operations, designed to make the ALF appear violent. That same uncertainty provides genuine ALF activists with plausible deniability should an operation go wrong, by denying that the act was "authentically ALF".

Several incidents in 1989 and 1990 were described by the movement as false flag operations. In February 1989, an explosion damaged the Senate House bar in Bristol University, an attack claimed by the unknown "Animal Abused Society". In June 1990, two days apart, bombs exploded in the cars of Margaret Baskerville, a veterinary surgeon working at Porton Down, a chemical research defence establishment, and Patrick Max Headley, a professor of physiology at Bristol University. Baskerville escaped without injury by jumping through the window of her mini-jeep when a bomb using a mercury-tilt device exploded next to the fuel tank. During the attack on Headley—which New Scientist writes involved the use of plastic explosives—a 13-month-old baby in a push-chair suffered flash burns, shrapnel wounds to his back, and a partially severed finger.

No known entity claimed responsibility for the attacks, which were condemned within the animal rights movement and by ALF activists. Keith Mann writes that it did not seem plausible that activists known for making simple incendiary devices from household components would suddenly switch to mercury-tilt switches and plastic explosives, then never be heard from again. A few days after the bombings, the unknown "British Animal Rights Society" claimed responsibility for having attached a nail bomb to a Huntsman's Land Rover in Somerset. Forensic evidence led police to arrest the owner of the vehicle, who admitted he had bombed his own car to discredit the animal rights movement, and asked for two similar offences to be taken into consideration. He was jailed for nine months. The Baskerville and Headley bombers were never apprehended.

In 2018 the London Metropolitan Police apologised for the activities of one of their undercover agents who had infiltrated the group. A police officer using the name "Christine Green" had been involved in the illegal release of a large number of mink from a farm in Ringwood in 1998. The mission had been approved by senior officers in the police.

1996–present

Property destruction began to increase substantially after several high-profile campaigns closed down facilities perceived to be abusive to animals. Consort Kennels, a facility breeding beagles for animal testing; Hillgrove Farm, which bred cats; and Newchurch Farm, which bred guinea pigs, were all closed after being targeted by animal rights campaigns that appeared to involve the ALF. In the UK, the financial year 1991–1992 saw around 100 refrigerated meat trucks destroyed by incendiary devices at a cost of around £5 million. Butchers' locks were superglued, shrink-wrapped meats were pierced in supermarkets, slaughterhouses and refrigerated meat trucks were set on fire.

In 1999, ALF activists became involved in the international Stop Huntingdon Animal Cruelty (SHAC) campaign to close Huntingdon Life Sciences (HLS), Europe's largest animal-testing laboratory. The Southern Poverty Law Center, which monitors U.S. domestic extremism, has described SHAC's modus operandi as "frankly terroristic tactics similar to those of anti-abortion extremists". ALF activist Donald Currie was jailed for 12 years and placed on probation for life in December 2006 after being found guilty of planting homemade bombs on the doorsteps of businessmen with links to HLS. HLS director Brian Cass was attacked by men wielding pick-axe handles in February 2001. David Blenkinsop was one of those convicted of the attack, someone who in the past had conducted actions in the name of the ALF.

Also in 1999, a freelance reporter, Graham Hall, said he had been attacked after producing a documentary critical of the ALF, which was aired on Channel 4. The documentary showed ALF press officer Robin Webb appearing to give Hall—who was filming undercover while purporting to be an activist—advice about how to make an improvised explosive device, though Webb said his comments had been used out of context. Hall said that, as a result of the documentary, he was abducted, tied to a chair, and had the letters "ALF" branded on his back, before being released 12 hours later with a warning not to tell the police.

In June 2006, members of the ALF claimed responsibility for a firebomb attack on UCLA researcher Lynn Fairbanks, after a firebomb was placed on the doorstep of a house occupied by her 70-year-old tenant; according to the FBI, it was powerful enough to have killed the occupants, but failed to ignite. The attack was credited by the acting chancellor of UCLA as helping to shape the Animal Enterprise Terrorism Act. Animal liberation press officer Jerry Vlasak said of the attack: "force is a poor second choice, but if that's the only thing that will work ... there's certainly moral justification for that." As of 2008, activists were increasingly taking protests to the homes of researchers, staging "home demonstrations", which can involve making noise during the night, writing slogans on the researchers' property, smashing windows and spreading rumours to neighbours.

Operation Backfire

On 20 January 2006, as part of Operation Backfire, the U.S. Department of Justice announced charges against nine Americans and two Canadian activists calling themselves the "family". At least 9 of the 11 pleaded guilty to conspiracy and arson for their parts in a string of 20 arsons from 1996 through 2001, damage totalled $40 million. The Department of Justice called the acts examples of domestic terrorism. The incidents included arson attacks against meat-processing plants, lumber companies, a high-tension power line, and a ski centre, in Oregon, Wyoming, Washington, California and Colorado between 1996 and 2001.

See also
 Animal rights and punk subculture
 Critical animal studies
 Deep ecology
 Direct Action Everywhere
 GANDALF trial
 Green anarchism
 Informal Anarchist Federation
 Open rescue
 PETA
 Total liberationism
 Earth Liberation Front

References

Further reading

"Terrorism 2000 / 2001" , FBI document mentioning the ALF, accessed January 10, 2014.
Bond, Walter. Always Looking Forward. NAALPO, 2011. 
Braddock, Kurt. "The utility of narratives for promoting radicalization: The case of the Animal Liberation Front" , Dynamics of Asymmetric Conflict, Volume 8, Number 1, April 2015.
Tester, Keith. "The British experience of the militant opposition to the agricultural use of animals" , Journal of Agricultural and Environmental Ethics, Volume 2, Number 3, September 1989.
 Wolf, Screaming (1991). A Declaration of War. NAALPO. 
 Young, Peter Daniel (2010). Animal Liberation Front: Complete Diary of Actions, The First 30 Years. Voice of the Voiceless Communications . 
 Young, Peter Daniel (2021) The A.L.F. Strikes Again: Collected Writings Of The Animal Liberation Front In North America. Warcry Communications.

External links 
 North American Animal Liberation Press Office
 Animal Liberation Frontline
 Talon Conspiracy
 documentary films on IMDb